Joachim Maier (born 5 May 1955) is Director at the Max Planck Institute for Solid State Research in Stuttgart (Germany) and heads the department of Physical Chemistry.

Education and career 
Maier studied chemistry at Saarland University in Saarbrücken, made his Masters and PhD in Physical Chemistry there. He received his habilitation at the University of Tübingen. From 1988 to 1991 he was responsible for the activities on functional ceramics at the MPI for Metals Research in Stuttgart, and from 1988 to 1996 he taught defect chemistry at the Massachusetts Institute of Technology. Notwithstanding other prestigious offers, he decided in favor of the Max Planck Society. In 1991 he was appointed Scientific Member of the Max Planck Society, Director at the MPI for Solid State Research and Honorary Professor at the University of Stuttgart. He is the recipient of various prizes and a member of various national and international academies. Joachim Maier is Editor-in-Chief of Solid State Ionics and on the board of a number of scientific journals.

Research 
Maier’s major research fields comprise physical chemistry of the solid state, thermodynamics and kinetics, defect chemistry and transport in solids, ionic and mixed conductors, boundary regions and electrochemistry. In this context energy transfer and storage are to the fore. Maier developed a scientific field nowadays termed nanoionics. In these fields Maier has authored/coauthored more than 600 publications in peer reviewed journals.

In 2019 he became a member of the German Academy of Sciences Leopoldina.

References

External links
  

1955 births
Living people
20th-century German chemists
Members of the German Academy of Sciences Leopoldina
21st-century German chemists
Solid state chemists
Computational chemists
Max Planck Institute directors
Saarland University alumni
Academic staff of the University of Tübingen
People from Neunkirchen, Saarland